Kathy Giusti is a business leader and a healthcare disrupter. She is a two-time cancer survivor having been diagnosed with multiple myeloma and breast cancer. Kathy Co-Founded the Multiple Myeloma Research Foundation (the MMRF) where she served as CEO and President for nearly two decades. She also Co-Chaired the Harvard Business School (HBS) Kraft Precision Medicine Accelerator, which she helped found, as a Senior Fellow at Harvard Business School.

Kathy is recognized as a pioneer in precision medicine, having seen its vast potential in oncology and other diseases. She uses her patient experience and business acumen to drive science faster with innovative business models across registries, big data, clinical trials, and venture. Kathy is a champion of patient engagement, encouraging each patient take initiative to optimize their own care.

Kathy has been named one of Time magazine's 100 Most Influential People in the world. and ranked #19 on Fortune's list of Worlds' 50 Greatest Leaders.

Diagnosis 
In 1996, Kathy Giusti was diagnosed with multiple myeloma, an incurable blood cancer. When diagnosed, Giusti was 37 years old and was given three years to live. At the time of her diagnosis, there were no new treatments in the pipeline for multiple myeloma. In 2022, Kathy was diagnosed with early-stage breast cancer as well.

Career

Early career 
Kathy held executive positions with increasing responsibility in consumer marketing with Gillette/Procter & Gamble and in the pharmaceutical sector of the healthcare industry with Merck & Co. and G.D. Searle & Company (now Pfizer).

The Multiple Myeloma Research Foundation 
In 1998, with her identical twin sister Karen Andrews, Kathy Founded the Multiple Myeloma Research Foundation (the MMRF). The MMRF’s mission is to accelerate a cure for each and every multiple myeloma patient.

As Founder, President, CEO, and Chief Mission Officer Kathy has led the MMRF in establishing partnerships and collaborative research models in precision medicine including the Multiple Myeloma Research Consortium (MMRC), the MMRF CoMMpass™ study, CureCloud, the Right Track, and the Myeloma Investment Fund.

Under Giusti the MMRF has raised more than $500 million to fund research, 15 drugs have been approved to treat multiple myeloma, and many clinical trials are underway. These efforts have accelerated the pace at which treatments are brought to patients and more than tripled patients' survival.

Harvard Business School (HBS) 
Giusti joined the Harvard Business School faculty as Senior Fellow, Co-Chairing the HBS Kraft Precision Medicine Accelerator, a $20 million endowed program provided by Robert Kraft and the Kraft Family Foundation.

The Kraft Accelerator has convened more than 300 leaders from throughout the healthcare and precision medicine ecosystem, from different disease states, and from the investment community. The Kraft Accelerator has identified and published best practices for accelerating cures and created The Kraft Precision Medicine Accelerator Playbook for Cures.

Giusti has co-led the formation of the Kraft Accelerator Leadership Forum, a group of CEOs from disease-focused foundations working together to address the most important challenges, share best practices, and accelerate precision medicine models.

Appointments 
Kathy has been appointed to multiple positions and advisory boards, all with a focus on developing cures for cancer. These include:

 National Cancer Advisory Board (NCAB). Appointed by President George W. Bush. Served for six years during the Bush and Obama administrations.
 Precision Medicine Initiative (PMI) Working Group, appointed by President Obama
 Biden Cancer Initiative Advisory Committee and Biden Moonshot
 National Institutes of Health All of US Research Program
 Faster Cures Advisory Board Changemakers
 Verily Advisory Board
 IMS Board
EQRx Board

Recognition 
Giusti has received numerous awards for her leadership:  

 Named one of Time magazine's 100 Most Influential People in the world
 Ranked #19 on Fortune's list of Worlds' 50 Greatest Leaders 
 Recognized as 1 of 34 leaders changing healthcare by Fortune magazine
 Named an Open Science Champion of Change by the White House
 Presented the Harvard Business School Alumni Achievement Award
 Received the Leadership in Personalized Medicine Award by the Personalized Medicine Coalition.
Presented the 2021 American Association for Cancer Research Distinguished Public Service Award
Named the Healthcare Businesswomen's Association's Woman of the Year Award

In the Press 
Kathy has been featured in multiple business, healthcare, and mainstream publications:

 Twin Sister Caregivers Team Up to Fight Cancer and Help Millions Along the Way, AARP.org
 I’ve Been Diagnosed With Two Different Cancers—This Is What I’ve Learned, Prevention.com
 How to reduce racial disparities in cancer, TheHill.com
 How One Woman Used Her Multiple Myeloma Diagnosis to Fuel the Search for a Cure, Health.com
 Racial gaps persist in cancer care — here's how we can close them, TheHill.com
 Colin Powell showed that even the bravest are vulnerable, CNN.com
 50 years later, women still lead the charge in the fight against cancer, The Hill
 Female Disruptors: Kathy Giusti Of The Multiple Myeloma Research Foundation (MMRF) On The Three Things You Need To Shake Up Your Industry, Authority Magazine
 Warp Speed to cancer cures – COVID vaccine should be our model to save more lives, FOXNews.com 
 Reuters Digital Health: The broken healthcare system and what covid showed us about how to fix it
 What Covid can teach us about cancer, CNN.com
 An Urgent Mission to Speed Progress Against Cancer, Wall Street Journal
 She Was Given Three Years to Live. So She Transformed Cancer Research, Forbes.com
 How One Family Faced Difficult Decisions About DNA Sequencing, Wall Street Journal
 Kathy Giusti: Sharing Life Lessons From a Death Sentence, The New York Times
4 Important Steps to Take After a Cancer Diagnosis, Time
 These 3 Former Business Leaders are Disrupting Medicine, Fortune
 The Money Chase: Harvard Business School, CNBC

Podcasts 
Kathy has been invited to participate in multiple business, healthcare, and patient-focused podcasts:

 Managing Through Crisis: Why Urgency Can Bring Clarity, video of podcast with Harvard Business School’s Chief Marketing Officer, Brian Kenny
 Everyone Talks to Liz Claman, Fox News Radio podcast
 Better Together, Kathy Giusti on Better Together with Maria Menounos
 WOW Podcast (Woman of the Week), PharmaVoice.com
 No Limits with Rebecca Jarvis, Episode #44 with Kathy Giusti, Cancer Fighter and Health Care Revolutionary

Publications 
Kathy has authored or co-authored multiple articles in business, consumer, and scientific publications:

 Reducing Racial Disparities in Cancer Treatment Demands Collective Action, Harvard Business Review
 Reducing Racial Disparities in Cancer Outcomes, Harvard Business Review
 Addressing Demographic Disparities in Clinical Trials, Harvard Business Review
A New Playbook for Cure-Seeking Nonprofits, Journal of Precision Medicine
 How Nonprofit Foundations Can Sustainably Fund Disease Research, Harvard Business Review
 What It Takes to Lead a Disease Research Foundation, Harvard Business Review
 How Medical Nonprofits Set Winning Strategy, Harvard Business Review[
 One Obstacle to Curing Cancer: Patient Data Isn’t Shared, Harvard Business Review
 What Cancer Researchers Can Learn from Direct-to-Consumer Companies, Harvard Business Review
 Closing Knowledge Gaps to Optimize Patient Outcomes and Advance Precision Medicine, Cancer Journal
 Understanding Differences in Critical Decisions in the Multiple Myeloma Patient Journey in the Era of Precision Medicine, American Journal of Hematology/Oncology

References

External links
KathyGiusti.com
MMRF website
Kraft HBS Precision Medicine Accelerator website

1958 births
Living people
American health care businesspeople
American health care chief executives
Harvard Business School alumni
Identical twins
People with multiple myeloma
People from Connecticut
University of Vermont alumni
Cancer researchers
American twins
American women chief executives
American nonprofit chief executives
21st-century American women